The meridian 77° west of Greenwich is a line of longitude that extends from the North Pole across the Arctic Ocean, North America, the Atlantic Ocean, the Caribbean Sea, South America, the Pacific Ocean, the Southern Ocean, and Antarctica to the South Pole.

The 77th meridian west forms a great circle with the 103rd meridian east.

From Pole to Pole
Starting at the North Pole and heading south to the South Pole, the 77th meridian west passes through:

{| class="wikitable plainrowheaders"
! scope="col" width="120" | Co-ordinates
! scope="col" | Country, territory or sea
! scope="col" | Notes
|-
| style="background:#b0e0e6;" | 
! scope="row" style="background:#b0e0e6;" | Arctic Ocean
| style="background:#b0e0e6;" |
|-
| 
! scope="row" | 
| Nunavut — Ellesmere Island
|-
| style="background:#b0e0e6;" | 
! scope="row" style="background:#b0e0e6;" | Baffin Bay
| style="background:#b0e0e6;" |
|-
| 
! scope="row" | 
| Nunavut — Bylot Island and Baffin Island
|-
| style="background:#b0e0e6;" | 
! scope="row" style="background:#b0e0e6;" | Foxe Basin
| style="background:#b0e0e6;" |
|-
| 
! scope="row" | 
| Nunavut — Bray Island
|-
| style="background:#b0e0e6;" | 
! scope="row" style="background:#b0e0e6;" | Foxe Basin
| style="background:#b0e0e6;" |
|-
| 
! scope="row" | 
| Nunavut — Prince Charles Island
|-
| style="background:#b0e0e6;" | 
! scope="row" style="background:#b0e0e6;" | Foxe Basin
| style="background:#b0e0e6;" |
|-
| 
! scope="row" | 
| Nunavut — Foxe Peninsula, Baffin Island
|-
| style="background:#b0e0e6;" | 
! scope="row" style="background:#b0e0e6;" | Hudson Strait
| style="background:#b0e0e6;" |
|-
| 
! scope="row" | 
| Nunavut — Salisbury Island
|-
| style="background:#b0e0e6;" | 
! scope="row" style="background:#b0e0e6;" | Hudson Strait
| style="background:#b0e0e6;" |
|-
| 
! scope="row" | 
| Quebec
|-
| style="background:#b0e0e6;" | 
! scope="row" style="background:#b0e0e6;" | Hudson Bay
| style="background:#b0e0e6;" |
|-valign="top"
| 
! scope="row" | 
| Quebec Ontario — from 
|-
| style="background:#b0e0e6;" | 
! scope="row" style="background:#b0e0e6;" | Lake Ontario
| style="background:#b0e0e6;" |
|-valign="top"
| 
! scope="row" | 
| New York Pennsylvania — from  Maryland — from  District of Columbia — from  Maryland — from  Virginia — from  North Carolina — from 
|-
| style="background:#b0e0e6;" | 
! scope="row" style="background:#b0e0e6;" | Atlantic Ocean
| style="background:#b0e0e6;" | 
|-
| 
! scope="row" | 
| Man-O-War Cay and Great Abaco Island
|-valign="top"
| style="background:#b0e0e6;" | 
! scope="row" style="background:#b0e0e6;" | Atlantic Ocean
| style="background:#b0e0e6;" | Passing just west of the island of Eleuthera,  (at ) Passing just east of the island of New Providence,  (at )
|-
| 
! scope="row" | 
|
|-
| style="background:#b0e0e6;" | 
! scope="row" style="background:#b0e0e6;" | Caribbean Sea
| style="background:#b0e0e6;" |
|-
| 
! scope="row" | 
|
|-
| style="background:#b0e0e6;" | 
! scope="row" style="background:#b0e0e6;" | Caribbean Sea
| style="background:#b0e0e6;" |
|-
| 
! scope="row" | 
|
|-
| 
! scope="row" | 
|
|-
| 
! scope="row" | 
|
|-
| 
! scope="row" | 
| Passing just east of Lima (at )
|-
| style="background:#b0e0e6;" | 
! scope="row" style="background:#b0e0e6;" | Pacific Ocean
| style="background:#b0e0e6;" |
|-
| style="background:#b0e0e6;" | 
! scope="row" style="background:#b0e0e6;" | Southern Ocean
| style="background:#b0e0e6;" |
|-valign="top"
| 
! scope="row" | Antarctica
|-
|}

See also
76th meridian west
78th meridian west

w077 meridian west